Cathie Jung (born 1937) is an American Victorian dress and corset enthusiast residing in Manteo, NC, United States. She has held the Guinness World Record for the smallest waist on a living person since 1999. Jung, who is 1.72 meters (5 ft 8 in) tall, has a waist that measures 38.1 centimeters (15.0 in).

Jung appears uncredited, by her own choice, due to the undesirable contents, in the Matthew Barney film Cremaster 2 in the role of Baby Fay La Foe.

Personal life 
Jung is married to Bob Jung, an orthopedic surgeon, with whom she has three children, including a daughter. Jung studied biology at Tufts University, where she met her future husband.

Jung began waist training in 1959, shortly before her marriage to Bob.

Notes

External links
Official website

1937 births
Living people